The Reporter is an independent non-profit Taiwan-based digital media outlet launched in December 2015 focusing on investigative journalism. It is a member of the Global Investigative Journalism Network.

Ownership and editorial team 

The Reporter is independently owned by The Reporter Foundation which is overseen by a board of 11 members, directed by Huang Jong-tsun, who was the Minister of Education from 2002 to 2004.  The media outlet employs about 25 full-time staff.  The editor-in-chief is Sherry Lee (李雪莉), who previously worked as an editor at Commonwealth Magazine.

Coverage 

The first major story from The Reporter was its report on labor abuses and human trafficking in the Taiwanese fishing industry in January 2017.  It won several awards for this report, including the Award for Excellence in Human Rights Reporting, Information Graphics, and Investigative Reporting from the 2017 Society of Publishers in Asia (SOPA) Awards  and the 2016 Chinese Multimedia Award from the Human Rights Press Awards.

In response to its 2022 investigation on the use of foreign students as cheap labor, Democratic Progressive Party legislator Fan Yun called for the Ministry of Education to put an end to the practice.

Funding 

The Reporter was founded by a 5 million NTD ($160,000 USD) donation from T. H. Tung, co-founder of Asus.  It relies solely on public donations for its operations.  As of October 2017, it has about 400 regular donors from which it raises about $200,000 USD annually.  It raises additional revenue by organizing workshops at local universities.

References

External links
Official website
English edition

2015 establishments in Taiwan
Chinese-language newspapers (Traditional Chinese)
Mass media in Taiwan